Ivan Kuznetsov (born 8 June 1996) is a Russian alpine skier. He competed in the 2018 Winter Olympics.

World Championship results

References

1996 births
Living people
Alpine skiers at the 2018 Winter Olympics
Alpine skiers at the 2022 Winter Olympics
Russian male alpine skiers
Olympic alpine skiers of Russia
Universiade gold medalists for Russia
Universiade medalists in alpine skiing
Medalists at the 2019 Winter Universiade
21st-century Russian people